is a railway station on Kintetsu Railway's Kyoto Line located in the town of Seika, Kyoto Prefecture, Japan.

Both express and local trains stop at Shin-Hōsono Station. It is one of the major stations of the Kansai Science City.

Connecting line from Shin-Hosono Station
JR West
Katamachi Line (Gakkentoshi Line) - Hōsono Station

Layout
The station has 2 platforms serving 4 tracks. An elevated walkway connects the station with the adjacent Hōsono Station on the Katamachi Line (Gakkentoshi Line) of JR West.

Platforms

Bus connections

History
 1928 - The station opens when Nara Electric Railway starts operation between Momoyamagoryo-mae and Saidaiji
 1963 - NER merges into Kintetsu
 1994 - Station house is rebuilt as an elevated building
 2000 - The station is promoted to an express train stop
 2007 - Starts using PiTaPa

Adjacent stations

References

External links

Kintetsu station information 

Railway stations in Japan opened in 1928
Railway stations in Kyoto Prefecture